Bakraur, sometimes called Bakrour, is a village located slightly east of Bodh Gaya in the state of Bihar, India. It lies directly across the Phalgu River from the town of Bodh Gaya, where Gautama Buddha is said to have attained enlightenment.

The village of Bakraur is believed to be the home of Sujata, who is said to have fed Gautama Buddha milk and rice shortly before he attained Enlightenment. A stupa dedicated to Sujata has been erected in Bakraur (photo).

See also
List of Monuments of National Importance in Bihar

References

External links
Sujata Stupa (YouTube)

Buddhist pilgrimage sites in India
History of Buddhism in India
Tourist attractions in Bihar
Buddhist sites in Bihar
Cities and towns in Gaya district
Villages in Gaya district
Religious tourism in India